Turn Me Loose is an extended play by American country music artist Vince Gill. It was released in 1984 by RCA Nashville. The album produced three chart singles on the Billboard country chart in "Victim of Life's Circumstances", "Oh Carolina", and the title track, which respectively reached #40, #38, and #39.

Track listing
All tracks written by Vince Gill except where noted.

1994 re-release

Personnel
 Richard Bennett - acoustic guitar
 Tony Brown - electric piano
 Hank DeVito - steel guitar
 Vince Gill - acoustic guitar, electric guitar, lead vocals, background vocals
 Emory Gordy Jr. - bass guitar
 Emmylou Harris - background vocals
 John Hobbs - piano
 Carl Jackson - background vocals
 Larrie Londin - drums
 Jay Dee Maness - steel guitar
 Janis Gill - background vocals
 Herb Pedersen - background vocals
 Mike Porter - percussion
 Brent Rowan - electric guitar
 Pete Wasner - piano

Chart performance

References

1984 debut EPs
Vince Gill albums
Albums produced by Emory Gordy Jr.
RCA Records EPs